Cedar Township is one of twenty townships in Benton County, Iowa, USA.  As of the 2000 census, its population was 533.

History
Cedar Township was founded in 1851.

Geography
According to the United States Census Bureau, Cedar Township covers an area of 43.2 square miles (111.89 square kilometers); of this, 42.78 square miles (110.79 square kilometers, 99.02 percent) is land and 0.43 square miles (1.1 square kilometers, 0.98 percent) is water.

Cities, towns, villages
 Mount Auburn

Adjacent townships
 Jefferson Township, Buchanan County (northeast)
 Harrison Township (east)
 Taylor Township (southeast)
 Jackson Township (south)
 Monroe Township (southwest)
 Bruce Township (west)
 Big Creek Township, Black Hawk County (northwest)

Cemeteries
The township contains these three cemeteries: Engledow, Greenwall and Mount Auburn.

School districts
 Union Community School District
 Vinton-Shellsburg Community School District

Political districts
 Iowa's 3rd congressional district
 State House District 39
 State Senate District 20

References
 United States Census Bureau 2007 TIGER/Line Shapefiles
 United States Board on Geographic Names (GNIS)
 United States National Atlas

External links
 US-Counties.com
 City-Data.com

Townships in Benton County, Iowa
Cedar Rapids, Iowa metropolitan area
Townships in Iowa
1851 establishments in Iowa
Populated places established in 1851